Erik B. Jørgensen is a Danish author and adventurer.

Biography 
Jørgensen was born and raised on a farm in Alkeshave on the island of Funen. After graduation, he served in the Sirius Sled Patrol and later in the Hunter Corps (the Danish army Special Forces). Since then, he has made numerous expeditions, which he details in his books. He is a member of the Adventurers Club of Denmark.

Bibliography 
 As sole author
 Skandinavian rundt i kajak [Around Scandinavia by kayak]. Kom ud (2013)
 Danmark rundt i kayak: isvinteren 2009-10 [Around Denmark by kayak: Winter 2009-10]. Glyndendal (2010)
 Oplevelser i ukendt land, I Knud Rasmussens fodspor [Experiences in uncharted lands, in the footsteps of Knud Rasmussen]. Glyndenal (2009)

 As contributor
 "Grønlands vildmark – brug den" ["Greenland's Wilderness"] in Lauridsen, Lena (2015). Inussuk, pejling mod Grønland [Inussuk: Heading to Greenland]. Culture Crossing.
 "Den helt store tur med ski, pulk og drage" ["Grand Tour by ski and sled"] in Magical Greenland: Death and Drama on the Glacier. Tales of the Adventurers Club. Glyndendal (2014)

External links 
 Erik B. Jørgensen at komud.dk

Danish male writers
Living people
Year of birth missing (living people)